Kailash Yadav was an Indian politician.  He was elected to the Lok Sabha, the lower house of the Parliament of India from the Jalesar, Uttar Pradesh constituency of Uttar Pradesh as a member of the Indian National Congress.

References

Indian National Congress politicians
India MPs 1984–1989
1944 births
Living people